In cartography, a phase line is a line to show  most often changing phases of a military operation,

Military usage

The term is also used in military terminology to refer to an imaginary line on a map used to coordinate phases of operations.
They are usually distinguished with different code names, varying by the particulars of the mission such as location and nature. By the same token, phase lines are frequently used after a battle or a military campaign by historians to describe what territory was controlled by which side at a given phase of the campaign.

Historical geography

Historical geographers use such techniques in a similar way, but written upon a longer time period. Dated phase lines on a map would indicate the growth or shrinkage of a great power of the era such as the expansion of the Roman Empire, the spread of Islam or Christianity. Other familiar phase line mapping most experience in late elementary or middle school classes would be the extent of various ice ages or the Ice Age consequential shrinkage or extension of continental landmasses down the continental shelves as the results of such climate changes.

References

Cartography
Historical geography
Military science
Military cartography